The superfamily Trichoceroidea includes one family: Trichoceridae, or winter crane flies,

References

Tipulomorpha
Diptera superfamilies